A maulstick or mahlstick   is a stick with a soft leather or padded head used by painters to support the working hand with a paintbrush or pen. The word derives from the German and Dutch Malstock or maalstok 'painter's stick', from malen 'to paint'.

In 16th- through 19th-century paintings of artists, including self-portraits, the maulstick is often depicted as part of the painter's equipment.

Gallery

References

Painting materials